The marbled polecat (Vormela peregusna) is a small mammal belonging to the monotypic genus Vormela within the mustelid subfamily Ictonychinae. Vormela is from the German word , which means "little worm". Marbled polecats are generally found in the drier areas and grasslands of southeastern Europe to western China. Like other members of the Ictonychinae, it can emit a strong-smelling secretion from anal sacs under the tail when threatened.

Description 

Ranging in length from 29–35 cm (head and body), the marbled polecat has a short muzzle and very large, noticeable ears. The limbs are short and claws are long and strong. While the tail is long, with long hair, the overall pelage is short. Black and white mark the face, with a black stripe across the eyes and white markings around the mouth. Dorsally, the pelage is yellow and heavily mottled with irregular reddish or brown spots. The tail is dark brown with a yellowish band in the midregion. The ventral region and limbs are a dark brown.

Distribution and habitat
The marbled polecat is native from southeastern Europe to Russia and China. Its range includes Bulgaria, Georgia, Turkey, Romania, Asia Minor, Lebanon, Syria, Jordan, Israel, Palestine, Armenia, Azerbaijan, Iraq, Iran, Afghanistan, north-western Pakistan, Yugoslavia, Mongolia, China, Kazakhstan, North-Siberian Altai steppes. In 1998, a marbled polecat was recorded on the Sinai Peninsula, Egypt.
Marbled polecats are found in open desert, semidesert, and semiarid rocky areas in upland valleys and low hill ranges, steppe country, and arid subtropical scrub forest.  They avoid mountainous regions. Marbled polecats have been sighted in cultivated areas such as melon patches and vegetable fields.

Behaviour and ecology
The marbled polecat is most active during the morning and evening. Its eyesight is weak, and it relies on its well-developed sense of smell. Vocalization is limited and consists of shrill alarm cries, grunts and a submissive long shriek.
It generally stays in a shelter once. When encountering each other, they are usually aggressive.

When alarmed, a marbled polecat raises up on its legs while arching its back and curling its tail over its back, with the long tail hair erect. It may also raise its head, bare its teeth, and give shrill, short hisses. If threatened, it can expel a foul-smelling secretion from enlarged anal glands under its tail.

To excavate burrows, the marbled polecat digs out earth with its forelegs while anchoring itself with its chin and hind legs. It uses its teeth to pull out obstacles such as roots.

Burrows of large ground squirrels or similar rodents such as the great gerbil (Rhombomys opimus) and Libyan jird (Meriones libycus) are used by marbled polecats for resting and breeding. They may also dig their own dens or live in underground irrigation tunnels. In the winter, marbled polecats line their dens with grass.

Reproduction 
Marbled polecats mate from March to early June. Their mating calls are most often heard as low, rumbling sounds in a slow rhythm. Gestation can be long and variable (243 to 327 days). Parturition has been observed to occur from late January to mid-March. Delayed implantation allows marbled polecats to time the birth of their cubs for favorable conditions, such as when prey is abundant.

Litter sizes range from four to eight cubs. Only females care for the young. Cubs open their eyes  around 38–40 days old, are weaned at 50–54 days, and leave their mother (disperse) at 61–68 days old.

Diet 
Marbled polecats are known to eat ground squirrels, Libyan jirds (Meriones libycus), Armenian hamsters (Cricetulus migratorius), voles, Palestine mole-rats (Spalax lecocon ehrenbergi), house mice (Mus musculus), and other rodents, small hares, birds, lizards, fish, frogs, snails, and insects (beetles and crickets), as well as fruit and grass. They are also recorded as taking small domestic poultry such as chickens and pigeons, as well as stealing smoked meat and cheese.

Conservation status 
In 2008,the marbled polecat was classified as a vulnerable species in the IUCN Red List due to a population reduction of at least 30% in the previous 10 years. In 1996, it had been considered a species of least concern. The decline in marbled polecat populations thought to be due to habitat loss and reduction in available prey due to use of rodenticides.

Data revealed that from the west to the east, a gradual decrease in morphological diversity was seen in polecat skulls, thus giving location as a factor to diversify the polecats. Also, the data related to the range formation of the species rather than climate change.

Threats
The marbled polecat was once sought for its fur, generally known as "fitch" or more specifically, "perwitsky" in the fur trade.

Subspecies
The subspecies of V. peregusna include:
 V. p. alpherakyi
 V. p. euxina
 V. p. negans
 V. p. pallidor
 V. p. peregusna
 V. p. syriaca

References

Further reading

External links

 Centre for Russian Nature Conservation
 Foundation for Wildlife Conservation in Romania
 EAZA European Carnivore Campaign

Ictonychinae
Carnivorans of Asia
Carnivorans of Europe
Mammals of Central Asia
Mammals of Azerbaijan
Mammals of China
Mammals of Europe
Mammals of the Middle East
Mammals of Pakistan
Mammals of Western Asia
Vulnerable animals
Vulnerable fauna of Asia
Vulnerable biota of Europe
Marbled Polecat
Marbled Polecat